= Sukku Fault =

Sukku Fault スック線 is an active fault that runs undersea section of the new US marines camp in Okinawa, Japan, under construction. It is the 2nd such fault after the Henoko Fault.
